The Thermal Oxide Reprocessing Plant, or THORP, was a nuclear fuel reprocessing plant at Sellafield in Cumbria, England. THORP is owned by the Nuclear Decommissioning Authority and operated by Sellafield Ltd (which is the site licensee company).

Spent nuclear fuel from nuclear reactors was reprocessed to separate the 96% uranium and the 1% plutonium from the 3% radioactive wastes, which are treated and stored at the plant. The uranium is then made available for customers to be manufactured into new fuel, and the plutonium incorporated into mixed oxide fuel.

On 14 November 2018 it was announced that reprocessing operations had ended at THORP after earning £9bn in revenue. The receipt and storage facility (which makes up nearly half of THORP's physical footprint), will operate through to the 2070s to receive and store spent nuclear fuel from the UK's PWR and AGR fleet. The decommissioning is expected to be finished around 2075.

History

Between 1977 and 1978 an inquiry was held into an application by British Nuclear Fuels plc for outline planning permission to build a new plant to reprocess irradiated oxide nuclear fuel from both UK and foreign reactors. The inquiry was to answer three questions: 

The result of the inquiry was that the new plant, the Thermal Oxide Reprocessing Plant, was given the go-ahead in 1978.

Construction of THORP started in 1979, and was completed in 1994. The plant went into operation in August 1997. Build cost was £1.8 billion.

In 1998/99, the plant faced severe economic difficulties when it failed to reach its reprocessing targets. Shut-downs for six months in the first half of 1998 and for several further months from December 1998, due to leakages, resulted in a failure to achieve the target of reprocessing 900 tonnes of fuel over that period. Most of the reprocessing contracts were with Germany and Japan.

On 14 November 2018 it was announced that reprocessing operations had ended at THORP after all existing reprocessing contracts had been fulfilled. It had reprocessed 9,331 tonnes of used nuclear fuel from 30 customers in nine countries, earning £9bn in revenue. The receipt and storage facility within THORP continues to operate. 

Decommissioning will take place after several decades to allow radiation levels to decline, and is expected to occur between 2075 and 2095. The estimated cost of decommissioning is forecast as £4 billion at 2018 prices.

Design

The chemical flowsheet for THORP is designed to add less non-volatile matter to the first cycle PUREX raffinate. One way in which this is done is by avoiding the use of ferrous compounds as plutonium reducing agents. In this plant the reduction is done using either hydrazine or HAN (hydroxylamine nitrate). The plant releases gaseous emissions of krypton-85, a radioactive beta-emitter with a half-life of 10.7 years. The Radiological Protection Institute of Ireland (RPII) commenced 24-hour atmospheric monitoring for krypton-85 in 1993, prior to the plant's commissioning.

The cooled oxide fuel is chopped up in the Shear Cell and the fuel dissolved in nitric acid. It is chemically conditioned before passing to the chemical separation plant. Pulsed columns (designated HA/HS) are used to initially separate the majority of the uranium and plutonium from the fission products by transferring them into the solvent phase, which comprises tri-butyl phosphate in odourless kerosene (TBP/OK). The transfer is done in the HA column with the HS column providing further removal of fission products. 2 further pulsed columns (designated BS/BX) and a mixer/settler assembly (1BXX) then separate the uranium and plutonium into separate streams. Plutonium is reduced to the +3 oxidation state, which is insoluble in the solvent phase so ends up in the aqueous phase exiting the 1BX column.

The 1BXX mixer/settler completes the removal of Pu from the solvent phase. The 1BS column removes any remaining Uranium from the aqueous phase by the use of fresh solvent.

Pulsed columns then purify the plutonium, removing the troublesome fission products that remain. A mixer/settlet (1C) is used to transfer (washes) the uranium across to the aqueous phase ready for the next stage. Uranium purification is achieved using three mixer settlers (UP1 - UP3) similar to those in use on the existing Magnox reprocessing plant. Evaporation of the two product streams then occurs before further processing is undertaken. Uranium is converted to UO3 powder while the plutonium is converted to PuO2 powder and sent to storage.

Pulsed columns were chosen to avoid the risk of a criticality incident occurring within the plant. This can happen if sufficient fissile material comes together to start an uncontrolled chain reaction, producing a large release of neutrons. The risks and mechanisms are well understood and the plant design is arranged to prevent its occurrence, i.e.: intrinsically safe.

2005 internal leak
On 9 May 2005 it was announced that THORP suffered a large leak of a highly radioactive solution, which had first started in July 2004.  British Nuclear Group's board of inquiry determined that a design error led to the leak, while a complacent culture at the plant delayed detection for nine months. Operations staff did not discover the leak until safeguards staff reported major fluid accountancy discrepancies.

Altogether 83 cubic metres (82,966 litres) of hot nitric acid solution leaked from a small fractured feedpipe, which was discovered when a remote camera was sent in to examine THORP's Feed Clarification Cell on 19 April 2005. All the fluids collected under gravity into the secondary containment, which is a stainless steel tub embedded in 2-metre thick reinforced concrete, capable of holding 250 cubic metres of fluids.

The solution from the spill was estimated to contain 20 metric tons of uranium and 160 kilograms of plutonium. The leaked solution was safely recovered into primary containment using originally installed steam ejectors. Radiation levels in the cell precluded entry of humans.

The pipe fractured due to lateral motion of an accountancy tank, which measures volume by weight and moves horizontally and vertically in the process. The tank's original design had restraint blocks to prevent lateral motion, but these were later removed from the design for seismic uncoupling.

The incident was classified as Level 3 out of 7 on the International Nuclear Event Scale (INES), a "serious incident", due to the amount of radioactive inventory that leaked from primary to secondary containment without discovery over a number of months. This was initially considered by BNFL to be surprisingly high, but the specifications of the scale required it.

The British Nuclear Group was convicted for breaches of health and safety regulations following the accident, and fined £500,000.

Production at the plant restarted in late 2007, but in early 2008 stopped again for the repair of an underwater lift that moved fuel for reprocessing.

See also

 Nuclear fuel cycle
 Reprocessed uranium
 Red oil
 PUREX
 Pyrometalurgical Processing

Other reprocessing sites
 COGEMA La Hague site
 Rokkasho Reprocessing Plant
 West Valley Reprocessing Plant
 Mayak
 Tōkai, Ibaraki (Tokaimura nuclear accident)

References

External links
Nuclear Decommissioning Authority
Sellafield Limited
Bellona Foundation - Excellent Site for Detailed Info on Sellafield and associated environmental issues.
Nuclear unit closed after checks - BBC, 23 April 2005
Huge radioactive leak closes Thorp nuclear plant - The Guardian, 9 May 2005
THORP Fractured Pipe – Board of Inquiry Report, BNFL, 26 May 2005
Thorp officials work to restore UK nuke reprocessing facility - Bellona Foundation, 7 July 2005
Thorp board of enquiry report released - Nuclear Engineering International, 27 July 2005
 Nuclear staff suspended over leak - BBC, 4 August 2005
Workload forces delay over Thorp reopening - News & Star, 11 November 2005
Leak of Radioactive Liquor in the Feed Clarification Cell at BNG THORP Sellafield, Review of the Management and Technical Aspects of the Failure and its Implications for the Future of THORP, John Large, 13 April 2006 - includes diagrams
Thorp restart approved - Nuclear Engineering International, 17 January 2007
Culture clubbed - Nuclear Engineering International, 25 April 2007
HSE report into the THORP leak
The sentencing of British Nuclear Group over the accident at THORP, Mr Justice Openshaw, 16 October 2006

Nuclear facilities
Nuclear technology in the United Kingdom
Buildings and structures in Cumbria